Stigbergstorget tram stop is a tram stop in Gothenburg (Stigberget). After until Ostindiegatan it splits. Lines 3 and 9 go via Chapmans Torg and Vagnhallen Majorna. Line 11 goes via Majvallen.

Rail transport in Gothenburg
Tram transport in Sweden